Frank H. Motz  (October 1, 1869 – March 18, 1944), was an American third baseman in Major League Baseball for the Philadelphia Phillies.

External links

1869 births
1944 deaths
Major League Baseball first basemen
Baseball players from Pennsylvania
19th-century baseball players
Philadelphia Phillies players
Akron Acorns players
Fort Worth Panthers players
Akron Akrons players
Portland Gladiators players
Atlanta Firecrackers players
St. Paul Saints (Western League) players
Atlanta Windjammers players
Indianapolis Hoosiers (minor league) players